Nicholas Francis Ward Earls (born 8 October 1963) is a novelist from Brisbane, Australia, who writes humorous popular fiction about everyday life. The majority of his novels are set in his home town of Brisbane. He fronted a major Brisbane tourism campaign.

Biography
Earls was born on 8 October 1963 in Newtownards, Northern Ireland. He emigrated to Australia with his parents and sister at the age of nine. Living in Brisbane, he was educated at the Anglican Church Grammar School there. He completed a medical degree at the University of Queensland and worked as a GP before turning to writing.

Career
Earls has been compared to Nick Hornby.
Zigzag Street, his second novel, won the Betty Trask Award in 1998 (sharing with Kiran Desai's Hullaballoo in the Guava Orchard). His young-adult novel, 48 Shades of Brown, won the Children's Book Council of Australia Book of the Year Award for older readers in 2000. Several of his novels (After January and 48 Shades of Brown) have been adapted for theatre, and 48 Shades of Brown was adapted into a film entitled 48 Shades, released in August 2006. Earls has also written other novels, including Bachelor Kisses (which borrows its title from a song by Brisbane band The Go-Betweens), Perfect Skin, World of Chickens, The Thompson Gunner, and young adult novels After January, and Making Laws for Clouds.
 
Earls has also contributed to the four best-selling anthologies in the Girls' Night In series as well as Kids' Night In and Kids' Night in 2 as editor. His most recent novels are  Welcome to Normal, a collection of original short stories, The True Story of Butterfish, about a former rock star re-adjusting to mundane life in the Brisbane suburbs, and Monica Bloom, based on his own adolescent experience of an ill-fated crush.

Several of his books have been adapted for the stage by Brisbane's La Boite Theatre Company.

He is referenced in the film All My Friends Are Leaving Brisbane.

Bibliography

For children

Series: Word Hunters

Short fiction

Collections

Poetry

Critical studies and reviews
 Review of The fix.
Introduction to a reissue of The Delinquents by Criena Rohan, 2014 Retrieved 17 October 2015

References

External links
Nick Earls – the official Nick Earls web site
The University of Queensland – 2006 Alumnus of the Year
Stories from the Q150 Steam Train – Nick Earls by Nick Earls, a 3 min 56 sec video, published by State Library of Queensland as part of Storylines:Q150 digital stories

20th-century Australian novelists
21st-century Australian novelists
Australian male novelists
Australian male short story writers
1963 births
Living people
People from Newtownards
People educated at Anglican Church Grammar School
University of Queensland alumni
University of Queensland Mayne Medical School alumni
Northern Ireland emigrants to Australia
Writers from Brisbane
20th-century Australian short story writers
21st-century Australian short story writers
20th-century Australian male writers
21st-century Australian male writers